Solander Island Ecological Reserve is a  protected area on an island   west of Brooks Peninsula Provincial Park off the northwest coast of Vancouver Island in British Columbia, Canada. It was established in 1971. The reserve is closed to the public to protect the habitat of nesting seabirds.

References

Northern Vancouver Island
West Coast of Vancouver Island
Nature reserves in British Columbia
Islands of British Columbia